ICBC Turkey Bank A.Ş., previously known as Tekstilbank A.Ş. was founded in 1986. In 2014, GSD Holding A.Ş sold their 75.5% stock to Industrial and Commercial Bank of China. The acquisition completed in April 2015. In November 2015, the name of the bank changed to "ICBC Turkey". In July 2018, ICBC provided a $3.6-billion loan package for the Turkish energy and transportation sector. 

The remaining 24.5% stock is public and is operated in Borsa Istanbul. ICBC Yatirim, a subsidiary of ICBC, provides support to stock market investors.

References

Turkish companies established in 1986
Banks established in 1986
Banks of Turkey
Companies listed on the Istanbul Stock Exchange
Companies based in Istanbul
2015 mergers and acquisitions